"Milhouse Doesn't Live Here Anymore" is the twelfth episode of the fifteenth season of the American animated television series The Simpsons. It originally aired on the Fox network in the United States on February 15, 2004. The episode was written by David Chambers and Julie Chambers, which they would go on to work on other shows later on such as Fancy Nancy, and was directed by Matthew Nastuk.

Plot
During a school field trip, Bart notices a change in Milhouse's behavior. Milhouse talks back to Mrs. Krabappel and wanders away from the group. He causes mischief with Bart, and tells him that he does not care what anyone thinks of him anymore. Finally, Milhouse reveals that he is moving to Capitol City with his mother. Bart visits Milhouse in Capitol City, only to find that Milhouse has dyed his hair blonde, is wearing fashionable clothes, and is cultivating a "bad-boy" image, even going so far as to give Bart a wedgie in front of his new Capitol City friends. At home, seeing how depressed Bart is (who even cries), Marge suggests he spend more time with Lisa. The two begin to bond by washing the car and riding bikes, and after they discover an Indian burial mound together, they become best friends.
 
Meanwhile, at Moe's Tavern, Apu and Manjula are celebrating their anniversary, and Homer realizes he does not have a gift for Marge for their anniversary. After being thrown out of the bar, Homer sits on the street and people start giving him money. He dances and earns enough money to buy Marge some flowers. He also does a rendition of the song "Mr. Bojangles" and asks for money. Homer continues his panhandling, and eventually makes enough money to buy Marge a pair of diamond earrings. When he continues panhandling afterward, angry bums bring Marge to see what Homer is doing. Marge is mortified and angry, but cannot bring herself to throw the earrings away.

Milhouse returns to Springfield when his father wins custody of Milhouse via court order. After she finds out Bart told Milhouse about their secret Indian burial mound, Lisa feels that Bart is acting like their friendship never existed and that he has been using her to fill a void. Bart, however, shows her that he still values her as a sister by giving her a set of cards with nice things he will do for her on them, and the two hug. The episode ends with Isabel Sanford at the TV and Radio museum, pointing out how sitcoms usually resort to using sappy endings for their episodes.

Reception

Julie Chambers & David Chambers were nominated for a Writers Guild of America Award for Outstanding Writing in Animation at the 57th Writers Guild of America Awards for their script to this episode.

References

External links

 

The Simpsons (season 15) episodes
2004 American television episodes